The U.S. House Subcommittee on Europe is a subcommittee within the House Foreign Affairs Committee. It was formerly referred to as the Subcommittee on Europe and Emerging Threats, Subcommittee on Europe, the Subcommittee on Europe, Eurasia, Energy and the Environment, and the Subcommittee on Europe, Energy, the Environment and Cyber.

Jurisdiction
The subcommittee is one of five with what the committees calls "regional jurisdiction" over a specific area of the globe. Such jurisdiction includes political relations between the United States and countries in the region and related legislation, disaster assistance, boundary issues, and international claims. The regional subcommittees also oversee the activities of the United Nations and its programs in the region.

Members, 117th Congress

Historical membership rosters

115th Congress

116th Congress

References

External links
 Subcommittee page

Foreign Affairs House Europe and Eurasia